Ken Marlin is an American investment banker, international strategist, and author of The Marine Corps Way to Win on Wall Street: 11 Key Principles from Battlefield to Boardroom, ( St. Martin's Press 2016). He was the founder of Marlin & Associates a boutique investment bank and strategy advisor. He is also the Vice Chairman of Technology Investment Banking at D.A. Davidson, which merged with Marlin & Associates in September 2021. 

He is a member of the "Market Data Hall of Fame". In 2011, 2014, 2015, 2016, 2017 and 2018, Institutional Investor ("II"), the international publisher, named Ken as one of II's "Tech 50", which honored the 50 most "disruptive" figures in the financial technology sector. He was the only investment banker on the list.

Personal life and education
Marlin holds BA from the University of California (Irvine), an MBA from UCLA, and a post-MBA Advanced Professional Certificate in Corporate Strategy from New York University. He lives in Manhattan with his wife, Jacqueline Barnathan, an Emmy Award-winning senior producer for CBS News, and their daughter. From 2009 - 2017 Marlin raced Sportscars with Challenge Club Racing where he was season champion in the Ferrari F360 class 2012, 2015 and 2016.

Early career
From 1970–1981, Marlin served in the United States Marine Corps, as a Captain and Infantry Company commander. From 1981- 1991, Marlin was a senior executive with The Dun & Bradstreet Corporation, where he led global strategy as Senior Vice President. (At that time, Dun & Bradstreet was a conglomerate which owned Moody's Investors Service, Interactive Data Corporation, Datastream International, Reuben H. Donnelley, IMS Health, ACNielsen, Nielsen Media Research, D&B Software, D&B Plan Services, D&B Credit Services and a majority stake in Gartner Group). At Dun & Bradstreet, Marlin led transactions involving US and non-US firms, including transactions in 13 counties.  During Apartheid, Marlin led D&B's divestiture of three companies that D&B controlled in South Africa.  He also led D&B's efforts to establish a direct presence in Japan, Singapore and Hong Kong; and to expand presence in Australia, Denmark, France, Germany, and Switzerland.  Before the fall of the Soviet Union, Marlin led D&B's efforts to establish business information collection infrastructure in a number of Soviet Bloc countries. Later he assumed a role as a Group Executive.

In 1991, Marlin became president and CEO of Telekurs (NA), a global financial information technology firm owned by a consortium of Swiss banks. In 1995, Marlin and others acquired a large portion of Telekurs (NA) and formed Telesphere Corporation, where Marlin was president and CEO.  In 1997, Telesphere was sold to Bridge Information Systems (now part of Thomson Reuters), where Marlin became Executive Vice President. In 1999, Marlin left Bridge to join the media merchant bank and private equity fund Veronis Suhler Stevenson.

References

Living people
American investment bankers
Dun & Bradstreet
Year of birth missing (living people)